Amir Barghashi (born 15 June 1951) is a Swedish actor and dramatist.

Barghashi was born in Iran, where he received his education.  In Sweden, he has worked at Uppsala City Theatre and participated in Pingst by David Edgar. He has also participated in Josef och hans bröder at the Orion Theatre. He has participated in Guantanamo and Paradis is at Stockholm City Theatre. He wrote the manuscript of Paradis is. He has also been screenwriter of Kyss mina skor, which had premiere at Uppsala City Theatre 2001.

Filmography
2011 - Circumstance
2007–08 – Andra Avenyn
 2003 – Talismanen
Bäst i Sverige! (2002)
 2002 – Tusenbröder
Mellan himmel och hästben (2001)
Beck – Mannen utan ansikte (2001)
1998 – Tre kronor
Under mitt eget tak (1997)

References

External links

Swedish male actors
Living people
1951 births
21st-century Swedish dramatists and playwrights
Swedish male dramatists and playwrights